Stoned, Part II is the fourth album by the British neo-soul composer and multi-instrumentalist Lewis Taylor, released in 2004.

Track listing
Madman - 4:23
Keep Right on - 5:30
Reconsider - 3:51
When Will I Ever Learn - 3:45
Out of My Head Is the Way I Feel - 3:05
Carried Away - 3:33
Stoned, Pt. 2 - 4:13
Positively Beautiful - 4:10
Throw Me a Line - 3:43
Shame - 3:34
Won't Fade Away - 4:06
Keep on Keeping on - 4:48
US digital version bonus tracks
If I Lay Down With You - 3:14 (originally from the 2002 release Limited Edition)
'Throw Me A Line' is replaced with 'Til the Morning Light' on the US digital version.

All songs are composed and written by Lewis Taylor.

2004 albums
Lewis Taylor albums
Sequel albums